Atwood/Coghlin Airport  is located  northeast of Atwood, Ontario, Canada.

See also
Atwood Airport

References

External links
 Page about this airport on COPA's Places to Fly airport directory

Registered aerodromes in Ontario